The Long Lost is the first studio album by American electronic musician Daedelus and their wife Laura Darlington under the name The Long Lost. It was released on Ninja Tune in 2009.

Critical reception
Tim Sendra of AllMusic gave the album 3.5 stars out of 5, saying: "It may not work for everyone, especially someone looking for the visceral thrills of a Daedelus record, but if you are captured, you will end up captivated by The Long Lost." August Howard of XLR8R gave the album a 7 out of 10, saying: "While The Long Lost may not be a groundbreaking effort, it's unquestionably a pleasant listen." David Abravanel of Cokemachineglow said: "Inevitably, boredom, cynicism, and even jealousy may arise as issues here, but it's hard not to be momentarily entranced by something so loving and so strange."

Track listing

Personnel
Credits adapted from liner notes.

 Alfred Darlington – vocals, guitar, bass guitar, clarinet, melodica, keyboards, drum programming, writing, production
 Laura Darlington – vocals, flute, toy piano, kalimba, omnichord, writing, production, artwork
 Dexter Story – drums
 Christina Rossetti – lyrics (8)
 Andres Renteria – percussion (10)
 Ben Wendel – bassoon (12)
 Pete Curry – recording
 Matt Pzonak – recording
 Andrew Turner – recording
 Thom Monahan – mixing
 JJ Golden – mastering

References

External links
 

2009 debut albums
Ninja Tune albums